Suroshan (also Romanized as Sūroshān and Sorshan; also known as Shūrshānī and Sūrshānī) is a village in Niyarak Rural District, Tarom Sofla District, Qazvin County, Qazvin Province, Iran. At the 2006 census, its population was 65, in 24 families.

References 

Populated places in Qazvin County